The 1975 Richmond WCT, also known as the Fidelity Tournament for sponsorship reasons, was a men's professional tennis tournament. It was held on indoor carpet courts in Richmond. It was the tenth edition of the tournament and was held from 27 January through 2 February 1975. The tournament was part of the green group of the 1975 World Championship Tennis circuit. First-seeded Björn Borg won the singles title and the accompanying $12,000 first prize.

Finals

Singles
 Björn Borg defeated  Arthur Ashe 4–6, 6–4, 6–4
 It was Borg's 1st singles title of the year and the 9th of his career.

Doubles
 Fred McNair /  Hans Kary defeated  Paolo Bertolucci /  Adriano Panatta 7–6(8–6), 5–7, 7–6(8–6)

References

External links
 ITF tournament edition details

Richmond WCT
Richmond WCT
Richmond WCT
Richmond WCT
Richmond WCT
Tennis in Virginia